Yvonne Nauta (born 21 February 1991) is a former Dutch female speed skater who is specialised in long distances and was born in Uitwellingerga.

Nauta won three titles at the Junior World Championships (2 x team pursuit and 3000 meter). On 27 October 2013, she won the 5000 m title at the Dutch Distances Championships. Nauta participated in the 2014 European Championships and finished second behind compatriot Ireen Wüst. At the 2014 World Allround Speed Skating Championships in Heerenveen, she won the 5000 m and finished third in the final ranking.

Personal bests

References

External links
 SpeedsSkatingNews profile

1991 births
Living people
Dutch female speed skaters
Olympic speed skaters of the Netherlands
Speed skaters at the 2014 Winter Olympics
People from Wymbritseradiel
World Allround Speed Skating Championships medalists
21st-century Dutch women
Sportspeople from Friesland